Woodbourne Correctional Facility is a medium security men's prison operated by the New York State Department of Corrections and Community Supervision in Woodbourne, New York of Sullivan County. It is located on the same tract of land as maximum security Sullivan Correctional Facility.

The prison opened in 1933, designed by Alfred Hopkins, an estate architect with a sideline in prisons such as Lewisburg Federal Penitentiary in Pennsylvania.  Hopkins also designed Wallkill Correctional Facility and Coxsackie Correctional Facility for the state.

Notable inmates
Juvenile murderer Willie Bosket, serving three consecutive sentences of 25 years to life for offenses committed while in the Shawangunk Correctional Facility and at Woodbourne.  Bosket was housed in a specially-constructed plexiglass-lined cell in complete isolation but is no longer at Woodbourne.  
Rapper Shyne of Brooklyn served part of a 10-year sentence in Woodbourne, after being convicted of first-degree assault and reckless endangerment
Eric Smith, serving 9 years to life for the murder of Derrick Robie; released in 2022.

COVID-19

As reported by The SullivanTimes, 142 inmates tested positive for COVID-19 as of December 24, 2020. All the confirmed positives occurred during December. Widespread testing of the prison population began on November 9, 2020. From March through November, the New York State Department of Corrections & Community Supervision showed zero cases of COVID-19 at Woodbourne.

References

External links
Birds eye view from Microsoft Virtual Earth @ Live.com

Prisons in New York (state)
Fallsburg, New York
1933 establishments in New York (state)